Walter Rogers may refer to:

Walter Rogers (footballer) (1883–?), English soccer player
Walter E. Rogers (1908–2001), Democratic Congressman from Texas
Walter S. Rogers (1871–?), American illustrator
Walter B. Rogers, staff conductor for Victor Records
Walter Rogers, founder of the Rogers Group, a Mauritius-based conglomerate
Walter Henry Rogers, Attorney General of Louisiana from 1888 to 1892